The Walter A. Haas Jr. Pavilion is an indoor arena in the western United States, on the campus of the University of California in Berkeley, California. It is the home venue of the Golden Bears men's and women's basketball, women's volleyball, and men's and women's gymnastics teams. The arena is located in the middle of the main sports complex, overlooking Evans Diamond (baseball) and Edwards Stadium (track/soccer).

History
The arena was originally opened  in 1933 as the Men's Gym; it was renamed Harmon Gym in 1959, after Oakland financier A.K.P. Harmon, who donated the funds to build Cal's first indoor athletic facility in 1879.

The playing surface, after being known as simply "Room 100" since the arena opened, was renamed Pete Newell Court in 1987 in honor of head coach Pete Newell, who led Cal to the national championship in 1959.

Renovation
Proposals for replacing the old gym were bandied about from the 1970s onward, but sentiment was strongly in favor of rebuilding it instead.  As a result, the arena was heavily renovated from 1997 to 1999 after a donation of about $11 million from Walter A. Haas, Jr. of Levi Strauss & Co., building a new seating bowl within the existing walls.

The new facility retains the intimate atmosphere of its predecessor, while having almost two times the seating capacity at 11,858 (originally 12,300 and later 11,877). In particular, there are no soundproofing devices. The arena contains The Bench, a courtside section that holds approximately 900 student fans. The amount of student seating doubled from the old arena, up to 2,600 from 1,300. It also holds the Pacific-10 Women's Basketball attendance record of 10,525 people, set during a game against rival Stanford University on February 23, 2008.

The renovation, which cost $57.5 million, began after the final home game in March 1997 and was finished for the start of the 1999 season. During the construction, the basketball teams played at both the Kaiser Convention Center and the Oakland Arena in Oakland.

Notable games

On December 22, 2018, the 14th ranked California Bears Women's basketball team faced the number 1 ranked University of Connecticut Huskies Women's basketball team. The Connecticut women's basketball team prevailed 76-66 at Haas Pavilion. The game set attendance records at Haas Pavilion with over 10,000 fans in attendance.

The 2009 men's basketball game between Cal and arch rival Stanford on February 14 was part of a special celebration commemorating the 100th season of Golden Bear basketball, as well as a recognition of the 50th anniversary of Cal's national title in 1959.

On February 28, 2009 ESPN's College Gameday made its first appearance in Berkeley broadcasting live from inside Haas Pavilion for the men's basketball game against the #18 UCLA Bruins. Cal lost despite a large turnout.

On January 21, 2009 Comcast Sportsnet Bay Area's Chronicle Live filmed their show inside Haas for the men's basketball game against Oregon, which Cal would win. Chronicle Live Host Greg Papa also called the play-by-play for the game which was televised on Comcast Sportsnet California.

Retired jerseys
 # 13 - Colleen Galloway (1978–80) Retired February 17, 1981
 # 11 - Kevin Johnson (1984–87) Retired October 22, 1992
 #  4 - Alfred Grigsby (1992–97) Retired March 8, 1997
 #  5 - Jason Kidd (1992–94) Retired February 14, 2004
 # 40 - Darrall Imhoff (1958–60) Retired February 14, 2009

See also
 List of NCAA Division I basketball arenas

References

External links

Official facilities page
Official announcement of opening
History of Harmon Gym

California Golden Bears basketball venues
College basketball venues in the United States
College gymnastics venues in the United States
College volleyball venues in the United States
Basketball venues in California
Gymnastics venues in California
Volleyball venues in California
Sports venues in the San Francisco Bay Area
Sports venues in Berkeley, California